La ley de Baltazar is a Chilean telenovela created by Rodrigo Bastidas y Daniella Castagno for Mega. It premiered on June 7, 2022. It stars Francisco Reyes, Amparo Noguera, Daniela Ramírez, Gabriel Cañas and Simón Pešutić.

Plot 
Baltazar Rodríguez (Francisco Reyes) is a widowed man full of mysteries who lives on his farm by the sea. He has three children with whom he does not have a good relationship. After suffering a heart attack, Baltazar's children ask him to retire, but he wants to keep working and change society's view of the elderly. In addition, he will look for a way to conquer the great love of his life, Margarita (Amparo Noguera), a nun who is in charge of the town's school. Baltazar's daughter, Antonia (Daniela Ramírez), wants to find a way to take care of him, although his sons, Mariano (Gabriel Cañas) and Gabriel (Simón Pešutić), have their interests in his farm and see in his delicate condition the perfect excuse to sell it.

Cast

Main 
 Francisco Reyes as Baltazar Rodríguez
 Amparo Noguera as Margarita Fuentes
 Daniela Ramírez as Antonia Rodríguez 
 Gabriel Cañas as Mariano Rodríguez
 Simón Pešutić as Gabriel Rodríguez
 Francisca Imboden as Cristina Moya
 Andrés Velasco as Manuel Silva
 Ignacia Baeza as Sofía Moncada
 Mabel Farías as Rosa Zúñiga
 Fernanda Salazar as Anita Zúñiga
 Claudio Castellón as Fernando Gatica 
 Felipe Rojas as Gerónimo Mendoza
 Victoria de Gregorio as Teresa Maldonado
 Santiago Meneghello as Sebastián Schmidt
 Gabriel Urzúa as Hernán Amunátegui
 Andrea Eltit as Clarita Vial
 Luis Rodríguez as Luchito Gatica 
 Diego Madrigal as Benjamín Rodríguez 
 Francisca Armstrong as Candelaria Olmedo
 Vivian Inostroza as Colomba Rodríguez 
 Matías Bielostotzky as Matías Gatica

Guest stars 
 Catalina Stuardo as Elisa Martínez
 Javiera Hernández as Paula Fuentes
 Hugo Vásquez as Dr. Horacio Ledesma 
 Eduardo Reyes as José
 Matías Fernández as Genaro

Ratings

References

External links 
 

2022 telenovelas
2022 Chilean television series debuts
Chilean telenovelas
Mega (Chilean TV channel) telenovelas
Spanish-language telenovelas